Sergi García Pérez (born 14 April 1999) is a Spanish footballer who plays as a central midfielder for CE Sabadell FC, on loan from Albacete Balompié.

Club career
García was born in Barcelona, Catalonia, and joined RCD Espanyol's youth setup in 2017, from CE Mercantil. On 22 August 2018, after finishing his formation, he joined Segunda División B side CF Badalona.

García made his senior debut on 26 August 2018, starting in a 1–3 home loss against former side Espanyol's B-team. The following 31 January, after being rarely used, he moved to Tercera División side UE Sant Andreu.

On 25 July 2019, García returned to the third division after agreeing to a contract with CF La Nucía. The following 9 January, he moved to fellow league team AE Prat.

On 27 July 2020, García signed for Deportivo Alavés and was initially assigned to the reserves in division three. He made his first team – and La Liga – debut on 13 September, coming on as a late substitute for Pere Pons in a 0–1 home loss against Real Betis.

On 30 June 2021, García signed a three-year deal with Albacete Balompié, freshly relegated to Primera División RFEF. After helping in the club's promotion back to Segunda División, he was loaned to third tier side CE Sabadell FC on 1 September 2022.

Personal life
García's father Jaume was also a footballer and a midfielder. He too represented Espanyol and Alavés.

References

External links

1999 births
Living people
Footballers from Barcelona
Spanish footballers
Association football midfielders
La Liga players
Primera Federación players
Segunda División B players
Tercera División players
RCD Espanyol B footballers
CF Badalona players
UE Sant Andreu footballers
CF La Nucía players
AE Prat players
Deportivo Alavés B players
Deportivo Alavés players
Albacete Balompié players
CE Sabadell FC footballers